The 2019 Judo Grand Slam Osaka was held in Osaka, Japan from 22 to 24 November 2019.

Medal summary

Men's events

Women's events

Source Results

Medal table

References

External links
 

2019 IJF World Tour
2019 Judo Grand Slam
Judo
Grand Slam, 2019
Judo
Judo